Kane Morgan (born 15 January 1990), also known by the nickname of "Gayne" or "Morkoe", is an Australian former professional rugby league footballer who last played for the North Sydney Bears in the NSW Cup.  He previously played for South Sydney in the NRL competition.

Playing career
A junior from the Maroubra Lions club, Morgan represented the New South Wales under 18's.

Morgan played for the South Sydney Rabbitohs Toyota Cup (Under-20s) team in 2009 and 2010. He scored 26 tries in 2009 and was part of the Rabbitohs team that lost the grand final in 2010. He finished his Toyota Cup career with 34 tries from 41 matches.

In 2010 he played for the Junior Kiwis.

Morgan made his first grade debut for the Souths in 2011 on 1 April against the Manly-Warringah Sea Eagles.

In May 2012 he played for Sydney University in the Shute Shield and scored a try against Gordon.

Kane Morgan joined South Sydney Rabbitohs feeder club North Sydney Bears for the 2014 season.

Morgan made a total of 22 appearances for Norths.

References

External links
NRL profile

1990 births
Living people
Australian people of New Zealand descent
Australian rugby league players
Junior Kiwis players
North Sydney Bears NSW Cup players
Rugby league wingers
Rugby league centres
Rugby league players from Newcastle, New South Wales
South Sydney Rabbitohs players
Windsor Wolves players